The Flat Hat is the official student newspaper at the College of William and Mary in Williamsburg, Virginia. It prints Tuesdays during the College's academic year. It began printing twice-weekly in 2007; since its inception in 1911, The Flat Hat had printed weekly. It returned to weekly printing in 2015. In fall 2020, The Flat Hat began printing biweekly due to restrictions associated with the COVID-19 pandemic. The Flat Hat staff operates out of its office in William and Mary's Sadler Center.

The newspaper is printed as a broadsheet. During the early 1990s, The Flat Hat was printed with a colored front page and a separate colored variety section. Today, The Flat Hat's front page and back page are generally printed in color while the inside pages are printed in black and white.

The newspaper currently supports five sections: news, sports, opinions, variety and digital media. The news section covers local and national news, focusing on events at the College. The sports section covers all William and Mary varsity athletics and profiles teams and individual players. The opinions section publishes regular op-eds and staff editorials, and prints student letters to the editor. The variety section features regular columns, including "Behind Closed Doors" (the sex column) and "Confusion Corner" (an opinion column), "Penne For Your Thoughts" (a cooking column) and "Sharps and Flats" (a music review column) along with human interest stories. The digital media section produces multimedia content in the form of videos, podcasts, graphics and photos as well as maintains the newspaper's social media presence.

In October 2007, The Flat Hat won a Pacemaker award for excellence in the category of non-daily newspaper at a four-year university. The Pacemaker is an honor in collegiate journalism, and is awarded by the Associated Collegiate Press and the Newspaper Association of America Foundation.

In 2017, The Flat Hat was recognized with a "mark of excellence" award from the Society of Professional Journalists for in-depth reporting.

History
The Flat Hat derives its name from the public nickname of the F.H.C. Society, "the Flat Hat Club"; the Society was the first collegiate secret society in the territory of the present United States of America, founded at the College in 1750. The first issue of The Flat Hat was printed on October 3, 1911.

Origins of the name, "Flat Hat" 
The name can be traced back to the F.H.C. Society, a secret fraternity established at the College on November 11, 1750, and nicknamed the Flat Hat Club, whose most notable members included St. George Tucker, Thomas Jefferson, and George Wythe. As a collegiate fraternity, the Flat Hat Club was a predecessor of Phi Beta Kappa, which was founded at the College in 1776 and today is regarded as the leading academic honor society for undergraduates in the arts and sciences. According to the issue of The Flat Hat for September 28, 1928, twentieth-century members of the Flat Hat Club were directly responsible for the creation of the newspaper.

The badge of the F.H.C. was circular with a Rococo rendering of the coat of arms of the Society on the reverse and "FHC" in a large monogram on the obverse; beneath were a date and motto, Nov. XI. MDCCL Stabilitas et Fides. "The motto of the Flat Hat Club, Stabilitas et Fides, has always been the motto of The Flat Hat."

Website
The Flat Hat launched their website in the fall of 2006 and is hosted by WordPress. The website is updated daily with printed articles, online blogs, videos, podcasts, photojournalism stories, and the embedded pdf of its most recent Issuu. The site attracts 4,000 unique visitors weekly. About 300 of these viewers come from Facebook posts, 200 from the mobile app "News Break," and 160 from Twitter. The Flat Hat's Facebook page and Instagram each reach 1,500 unique users weekly. The website serves content securely through Secure Sockets Layer.

Flat Hat Magazine
In November 2019, the Flat Hat Magazine published its inaugural issue. The news magazine was created to promote long-form writing and creative design that is unrealistic for a weekly newspaper and publishes semesterly with the exception of Spring 2020, when the COVID-19 pandemic sent students home in early March.

Censorship
In 1945, Marilyn Kaemmerle, then editor of The Flat Hat, wrote an editorial titled "Lincoln's Job Half-Done" to commemorate the birthday of Abraham Lincoln. She encouraged the racial integration of William & Mary, citing that "the Negroes should be recognized as equals in our minds and hearts." The William & Mary Board of Visitors, the group appointed by the Commonwealth of Virginia to run the College, instructed then-president of the College John Pomfret to expel Kaemmerle. Pomfret compromised by removing Kaemmerle from The Flat Hat and asking her to sign a statement saying that the compromise was in the best interest of all concerned. Since 1945, The Flat Hat has had relative editorial control and autonomy.

In 1962, the newspaper ran an editorial criticizing College President Davis Young Paschall's decision to ban a communist speaker from campus. Paschall responded by calling then editor H. Mason Sizemore and other staff members into the Blue Room of the Wren Building and attempt to browbeat them into apologizing for the editorial.

The paper has no faculty adviser. The Flat Hat is a member of the College's Publications Council, a body made up of the editors of most publications on campus, as well as a member of the college administration. The Publications Council has direct financial control over the Flat Hat.

Staff
The exact number of staff who work on The Flat Hat varies each year but generally ranges between forty-five and fifty permanent staff members (students who are listed in the staff box of each issue of the newspaper). Students with or without experience in journalism are often encouraged to join. In 2010, the newspaper began an intern program focusing on providing journalistic experiences for underclassmen at William and Mary.

Like most other collegiate student newspapers, the staff includes not only reporters and columnists but an accounting department, a copyediting section, an Ombudsman and an executive and editorial staff.

In spring 2021, The Flat Hat published its first annual diversity report which aggregates information submitted by staff members in a voluntary form. This report includes information of staff demographic percentages including but not limited to racial background, gender identity and sexual orientation.

Major stories
The Flat Hat was the first news medium, student or professional, to break the news about the Wren Cross controversy, doing so in a news brief. After the decision received more journalistic attention, The Flat Hat continued to follow the controversy, including revocation of a twelve-million-dollar donation, placement of the cross in a display case, and, ultimately, Gene Nichol's resignation of the presidency of the College (which was impelled in part by the controversy surrounding the cross in the Wren chapel controversy).

In May, 2010, The Flat Hat was the first journalistic source in Williamsburg, professional or other, to announce the election of Scott Foster to the city council governing Williamsburg. Foster was the first William and Mary student ever to be elected to the council, and he had been endorsed by the editorial board of The Flat Hat.

In 2010, The Flat Hat was the first news source to report that ESPN continued to use a William and Mary athletic emblem that had been banned by the NCAA in 2006. ESPN ultimately discontinued the use of the emblem.

Special issues

The Fat Head
On April 1 of every year, in honor of April Fool's Day, the newspaper prints The Fat Head to accompany the usual semi-weekly issue. The Fat Head is a humor issue, usually with falsified articles and satirical commentary.

Best of the Burg
Every year around mid-December, The Flat Hat prints a special edition of the newspaper titled "Best of the Burg." The "Best of the Burg" issue outlines the staff's favorite picks for several restaurants in the Williamsburg area. In recent history, consistent winners have been The Cheese Shop, Aromas and The Trellis Restaurant all located in the Merchants Square area of Colonial Williamsburg.

Notable alumni
James Comey
Ben Domenech 
Mike D'Orso
Jill Ellis
David Lasky
Patton Oswalt
Amanda Petrusich

See also
List of publications at The College of William & Mary
List of student newspapers in the United States of America

References

External links 
 The Flat Hat
 The College of William and Mary's official website
 The Flat Hat Digital Archive Contains almost every issue of The Flat Hat from 1911 until the present.

1911 establishments in Virginia
College of William & Mary student life
Newspapers established in 1911
Student newspapers published in Virginia